Police is a 1958 Indian Hindi-language action-thriller film directed by Kalidas, produced by Deep Khosla and Pradeep Kumar, and starring Madhubala, Pradeep Kumar and Nadira. The music of the film was composed by Hemant Kumar.

Plot 
When an airplane brings ex dacoit Rangooni (Pradeep Kumar) from Singapore to Bombay, Inspector Mehra (Raj Mehra) looks upon Rangooni's return with well-founded suspicion. His arrival in Bombay disturbs the activities of a gang of jewel-theft specialists, led by man-about-town-Ramesh (Anwar Hussain). Rangooni foils the activities of the gang by forestalling the gangster. Manju (Madhubala), daughter of Bahadur Sunderdas, who has Rai encountered Rangooni many times, is excited by the prospect of getting the dacoit arrested and hopes to get a lot of publicity by so doing.

Ramesh, constantly thwarted by Rangooni, lays a trap for his opponent but in the last smashing chase scene is unmasked for what he is.

But who is Rangooni? What is the motive behind his seemingly incongruous actions?

Cast 
The main cast of the film was:
 Madhubala as Manju
 Pradeep Kumar as Rangooni
 Nadira
 Raj Mehra as Inspector Mehra
 Anwar Hussain as Ramesh
 Dhumal
Bhagwan

Soundtrack 
The soundtrack of Police was composed by Hemant Kumar and the lyrics were penned by Majrooh Sultanpuri.

Reception 
The film was commercially unsuccessful.

References

External links 

 

1958 films
1950s Hindi-language films